Mallotus rhamnifolius, the buckthorn-leaved kamala, is a species of understory, evergreen plant in the family Euphorbiaceae. It is native to Western Ghats of India and Sri Lanka.

Leaves
Simple, and opposite to subopposite, decussate; apex acute-acuminate: base rounded, entire; secondary_nerves are 6-paired.

Flowers
Inflorescence - axillary spikes.

Fruits
3-seeded brownish capsule.

Common names
In parts of India, and Sri Lanka, the plant is known by many local names.
Malayalam - pee-tsjerou-ponnagam 
Tamil - Marai-Yirdiyam 
Telugu - Konda-Kunkumu
Sinhala - Bulu hulu keppetiya (බුළු හුලු කැප්පෙටියා)

References

rhamnifolius
Flora of Sri Lanka
Flora of India (region)